In ancient Greek architecture, a propylaea, propylea or propylaia (Greek: προπύλαια) is a monumental gateway. They are seen as a partition, specifically for separating the secular and religious pieces of a city. The prototypical Greek example is the propylaea that serves as the entrance to the Acropolis of Athens. In this case, the propylaea is built wider than the Acropolis of Athens in order to allow chariots through. The construction of it was part of Pericles' great rebuilding program for Athens in c. 437 BCE. The project of the propylaea began once the Parthenon was almost done. It was overseen by Mnesicles (an Athenian architect). Though the work was suspended due to the Peloponnesian War, the important pieces of Mnesicles’ vision were able to come through (World History Encyclopedia). The Greek Revival Brandenburg Gate of Berlin and the Propylaea in Munich both evoke the central portion of the Athens propylaea. The architecture for the propylaea is unique in that it uses horizontal beams across the roof. These beams were supported by marble girders, which were supported by iron bars. The only other known use of metal in Greek architecture for structural purposes is the Temple of Zeus at Agrigento (World History Encyclopedia).

Etymology
The Greek word προπύλαιον propylaeon (propylaeum is the Latin version) is the union of the prefix προ- pro-, "before, in front of" plus the plural of πύλη pyle "gate," meaning literally "that which is before the gates," but the word has come to mean simply "gate building."

Propylaea of the Athenian Acropolis

The Propylaea was the monumental gateway to the Acropolis, commissioned by the Athenian leader Pericles in order to rebuild the Acropolis at the conclusion of the Persian Wars.

Propylaea outside the Greco-Roman world
The oldest known freestanding propylaeum is the one located at the palace area in Pasargadae, an Achaemenid capital.

A covered passage, called "the Propylaeum", used to face the Palace of Darius at Susa.

In the 18th Century, the Athenian Propylaea inspired Carl Gotthard Langhans in construction of the Brandenburg Gate in Berlin.

See also
Portal (architecture)
Triumphal arch
Gate tower

Notes

References 
 Berve, H.; Gruben, G.; and Hirmer, M. Greek Temples, Theaters, and Shrines (New York, 1963). A general look at selected Greek structures.
 Dinsmoor, William Bell (1922), "Structural Iron in Greek Architecture," American Journal of Archaeology, XXVI
 Dinsmoor, W. B., The Architecture of Ancient Greece (New York, 1975 - but actually a reprint of the 1950 publication). A general book on Greek architecture; dated in many areas but valuable for the Propylaea.
 Dinsmoor, W. B., Jr., The Propylaia I: The Predecessors (Princeton, 1980). A careful study of the predecessors of the Propylaea.
 Eiteljorg, Harrison, II, The Entrance to the Acropolis Before Mnesicles (Dubuque, 1993). A careful study of the predecessors of the Propylaea, with very different conclusions from those of Dinsmoor above.
 Lawrence, A. W., Greek Architecture (Baltimore, 1973). A general book on Greek architecture.
 Robertson, D.S. Greek and Roman Architecture''' (Cambridge, 1969). A general book on Greek and Roman architecture. Available in paper, this may be the best place to begin for those with no knowledge of ancient architecture.
 Travlos, J., Pictorial Dictionary of Ancient Athens (London, 1971). An encyclopedic approach to the monuments of Athens.
 The Perseus Project An electronic resource that provides quick information, but some of the information about the Propylaea was incorrect when the site was last checked. Several good photographs of the Propylaea are available through the Perseus project.
 Cartwright, Mark. “Propylaea.” World History Encyclopedia'', Https://Www.worldhistory.org#Organization, 24 July 2022, https://www.worldhistory.org/Propylaea/.

External links 

 Propylaea.org – leads to a variety of material, some scholarly, but many photographs as well

Acropolis of Athens
Ancient Greek buildings and structures in Athens
Ancient Greek culture
Types of gates